"Not a Sinner nor a Saint" is a eurodance song performed by Swedish band Alcazar. This was the first single to give a preview of the forthcoming album Alcazarized, but was only released in Sweden. Nevertheless, the song was added at radio stations around Europe. It is also the most played song of Alcazar in the United States.

Melodifestivalen 2003
In spring 2003, Alcazar entered the Swedish pre-selections for the Eurovision Song Contest. They ended up in third place. The single reached number 1 at the single sales chart, the Swedish Airplay List, "Tracks" and it is Alcazar's biggest hit in Sweden to date.

The single was released in a cardboard sleeve with an ultra glossy coating. Due to high public demand, some of the pressings did not get the glossy finish.

Formats and track listings
These are the formats and track listings of promotional single releases of "Not a Sinner nor a Saint".

CD single
"Radio Edit" – 3:01
"Disco Club Mix" – 4:45
"FL's Heaven And Hell Remix" – 4:22
"Sing-a-Long Version" – 3:00

Charts

See also
Melodifestivalen 2003

References

Alcazar (band) songs
Eurodance songs
2003 singles
Number-one singles in Sweden
Songs written by Bobby Ljunggren
RCA Records singles
Sony BMG singles
Melodifestivalen songs of 2003
2003 songs